This is a list of international television series which debuted, or are scheduled to debut, on Australian television in 2009. The list is arranged in chronological order. Where more than one program debuted on the same date, those programs are listed alphabetically.

Premieres

Free-to-air television

ABC1

ABC2

ABC3

SBS One

Subscription television

Notes

References

2009 in Australian television
Premieres